The Royle Family is a BAFTA award-winning television sitcom produced by Granada Television for the BBC. It stars Ricky Tomlinson, Sue Johnston, Caroline Ahern, Ralf Little and Craig Cash. 25 episodes of The Royle Family were made and broadcast.

Series overview

Episodes

Series 1 (1998)

Series 2 (1999)

Series 3 (2000)

Specials (2006–2012)

Charity Specials

Ratings

References

External links
The Royle Family at BBC.co.uk

Lists of British sitcom episodes

nl:The Royle Family
fi:Sohvanvaltaajat